The Theory of Whatever is the fifth album by English indie rock singer-songwriter Jamie T, released on 22 July 2022 through Polydor Records. The first single from the album, "The Old Style Raiders", was released on 4 May 2022, followed by "St. George Wharf Tower" on 21 June, and "Between the Rocks" on 20 July.

The album was Jamie T's first release in nearly six years and entered the charts at number one in its first week of release. It spent one more week in the charts at 36th position.

Critical reception

The Theory of Whatever holds a score of 82 out of 100 on the review aggregate site Metacritic, indicating "universal acclaim". NME stated the album was a "liberating return from a star as relaxed as ever", in their review where it received four out of five stars.

Track listing

Note
  indicates an additional producer

Personnel
Musicians
 Jamie T – vocals, background vocals (all tracks); programming (1–5, 10), guitar (2–4, 6, 7, 9–11), bass programming (3); bass, drums (9); piano (13)
 Rupert Jarvis – bass (1–3, 5, 7, 10)
 Jamie Morrison – drums (1–3, 5, 7, 10)
 Rob Harris – bass programming (1)
 Nerys Richard – cello (1)
 Hal Ritson – keyboards, programming (1)
 Richard Adlam – keyboards, programming (1)
 Hugo White – guitar (2, 3, 7–10), bass (8, 9, 13), programming (8–10), drums (9)
 Olly Burden – programming (4, 11), guitar (4)
 Matt Maltese – background vocals, guitar (8)

Technical
 John Davis – mastering
 Cenzo Townshend – mixing
 Jag Jago – engineering (1–3, 5–10, 12, 13)
 Olly Burden – engineering (4, 11)
 Camden Clarke – mixing assistance
 Jan Ashwell – mixing assistance
 Robert Sellens – mixing assistance

Charts

References

2022 albums
Jamie T albums
Polydor Records albums